The Young Fresh Fellows are an American alternative rock group, that was formed in 1981 in Seattle, Washington, United States, by Scott McCaughey and Chuck Carroll. Tad Hutchison, Chuck Carroll's first cousin, joined for the recording of the group's debut album in 1983.

History

Their first album was The Fabulous Sounds of the Pacific Northwest (1984) after which Jim Sangster joined the group on bass and McCaughey switched from bass to guitar. Carroll left the group in 1988, and was replaced by Kurt Bloch from The Fastbacks.

The song "Amy Grant", a comical song about Contemporary Christian music and pop music artist Amy Grant, from the album The Men Who Loved Music, was a success on college radio and arguably their biggest hit.

The band are still together, although after 1996's A Tribute To Music they released no new material until Because We Hate You (2001), a split release with McCaughey's other band, the Minus 5. McCaughey has given more attention to the Minus 5 since then, while Bloch and Sangster have formed the band Thee Sgt. Major III, and Hutchison is working more on visual art and design, as well as performing/recording as Chris & Tad with Chris Ballew of The Presidents of the United States of America. However, the Fellows released I Think This Is in 2009 and embarked on a tour of Spain that October.

From 1994 to 2011, McCaughey was a "fifth member" of R.E.M., playing guitar with the band both onstage and in the studio.

The band was mentioned in the They Might Be Giants song "Twisting", and in "Big Salty Tears" by The Ziggens, which was later covered by Bradley Nowell of Sublime on the album Sublime Acoustic: Bradley Nowell & Friends.

The tribute album This One's for the Fellows (2004) features twenty covers of Young Fresh Fellows songs by artists including The Presidents of the United States of America, Robyn Hitchcock, and The Makers. The Presidents' cover was featured in "Benderama," an episode of Futurama.

Discography

LPs
 The Fabulous Sounds of the Pacific Northwest (CD/LP) – PopLlama – 1984
 Topsy Turvy (CD/LP) – PopLlama – 1985
 The Men Who Loved Music (CD/LP) – Frontier Records – 1987
 Totally Lost (CD/LP) – Frontier Records – 1988
 Beans and Tolerance (LP) – Self-released – 1989
 This One's For the Ladies (CD/LP) – Frontier Records – 1989
 Electric Bird Digest (CD/LP) – Frontier Records – 1991
 It's Low Beat Time (CD/LP) – Frontier Records/Munster Records – 1992
 A Tribute to Music (CD/LP) – Rock & Roll Inc. – 1997
 Because We Hate You (CD) – Mammoth Records – 2001 (double CD split with The Minus 5)
 I Think This Is (CD) – Yep Roc Records – 2009
 I Don't Think This Is (CD/LP) – Munster Records / Rock&Roll Inc. Records – 2009 (four different tracks from the above, and different artwork)
 Tiempo de Lujo (CD/LP) – Yep Roc – 2012
 Exit Ramp (CD/LP) – Book Records – 2019
 Toxic Youth (CD/LP) – Yep Roc – 2020

EPs
 Temptation on a Saturday (CD/LP) – PopLlama/Munster – 1995

Official bootlegs 
 Beans and Tolerance (attributed to 3 Young French Fellows 3)

"Fans only" cassettes 
 Gag Fah – 1991

Compilations and lives
 Refreshments – 1987 – Collection of singles
 Somos Los Mejores (CD/LP) – Munster Records −1991
 Hits From The Break Up Album – 1991 – Collection of singles
 Gleich Jetzt (CD) – 1+2 Records – 1992
 Take It Like A Matador (CD) – Record Runner – 1993

Appearances
 Diamonds at a Discount – A Compilation of Frontier Recording Artists (LP) – Frontier Records – 1988 (contains their non-album single "I'm an Artiste on Frontier")

Tribute albums
 This One's for the Fellows (2004 – Blue Disguise Records).

References

External links

 
 Scott McCaughey interview, 2006
 

Musical groups from Seattle
Alternative rock groups from Washington (state)
Musical groups established in 1981
PopLlama Records artists
American indie rock groups